Bushahr, also spelt as 'Bashahr' and 'Bussahir' or 'Bushair' was a Rajput princely state in India during the British Raj. It was located in the hilly western Himalaya promontory bordering Tibet in the northern part of colonial Punjab region.

The territory of this former state is now part of Kinnaur and Shimla districts of the present Himachal Pradesh state. The erstwhile Bushahr state was traversed by the Sutlej river. It was bordered on the west by the Kulu, Lahaul and Spiti states and by Tehri Garhwal on the east.

History

The erstwhile Bushahr state was occupied by a Gorkha king from central Nepal from 1803 to 1815.  Ranjit Singh, the ruler of the Sikh state in the Punjab, intervened in 1809 and drove the Nepalese army east of the Satluj river. A rivalry between Nepal and the British East India Company over the annexation of minor states bordering Nepal eventually led to the Anglo-Nepalese War (1815–16) or the Gurkha War. Both parties eventually signed the Treaty of Sugauli, following which the Gurkhas were expelled from Kamru, the capital of Bushahr.

In 1898, Bushahr state was taken over by the British administration, although the Râja remained nominally in charge.  After British occupation, the Bushahr state was by far the largest of the 28 Simla Hills States. There was a tax revolt by Bushahr's peasants in 1906.

Heads of State
The original seat of the rulers of the erstwhile Bushahr state was at the Kamru Fort, in the village of Kamru at the banks of the Baspa River at Sangla in Kinnaur. The fort is currently abandoned and houses an idol of Kamakhya Devi (Kamakshi Dev), which is believed to have been brought several centuries ago from Kamakhya temple in Guwahati. The rulers subsequently moved to Sarahan.
The Palace of the "Raja of Bushahr state" at Sarahan ("The Srikhand view") was built by order of Raja Padam Singh for his lodging in September 1917. 
The current residence of the "Raja of Bushahr state" is at the Padam Palace at Rampur, Shimla district. The town of Rampur may have been founded by Raja Kehri Singh in the 17th century or by Raja Ram Singh in the 18th. The rulers moved down from their traditional seat in Sarahan to the banks of the river Sutlej. Bushair was one of the richest princely states in the hills and was an important center for trade between Tibet, Kinnaur and the lower areas.

With a personal gun salute of 9 guns, the ruler of Bashahr was the only Hills "Raja" amongst India's upper class of princely salute states, but was not entitled to the style of His Highness until independence in 1947.

Rulers
Rulers bore the title of Rana and then Raja.

Ranas
???? : Kehri Singh
???? : Ram Singh
???? - 1803 : Ugar Singh
1803 - 1815 : Nepalese occupation
Rajas
1816 - 1850 : Mahendra Singh
1850 - 1887 : Shamsher Singh
1887 - 1898 : Raghunath Singh
1898 - 1914 : Shamsher Singh (return to power)
1914 - 1947 : Padam Singh
1947 - 2021 : Virbhadra Singh
2021 - till date : Vikramaditya Singh

See also 
Simla Hills States
Political integration of India

References

External links
Genealogy of the rulers of Bashahr

Shimla district
Princely states of Himachal Pradesh
Rajput princely states